Xenocompsa is a genus of beetles in the family Cerambycidae, containing the following species:

 Xenocompsa flavonitida (Fairmaire & Germain, 1859)
 Xenocompsa martinsi Cerda, 1980
 Xenocompsa semipolita (Fairmaire & Germain, 1859)

References

Achrysonini